Sripada Srivallabha (Telugu: శ్రీపాద శ్రీవల్లభ, Tamil: ஸ்ரீபாத ஸ்ரீவல்லபர், Hindi: श्रीपाद श्रीवल्लभ, Kannada:  ಶ್ರೀಪಾದ ಶ್ರೀವಲ್ಲಭ, Marathi: श्रीपाद श्रीवल्लभ, Malayalam: ശ്രീപാദ ശ്രീവല്ലഭ) is an Indian guru of the Dattatreya Sampradaya (Lineage) who is regarded as an incarnation of Lord Dattatreya. He is considered as one of the first complete Avatars (incarnations) of the deity Dattatreya in Kali Yuga. Of note, Narasimha Saraswati, Manik Prabhu, Swami Samarth,  Shirdi Sai Baba , are believed to be other incarnations of Lord Dattatreya that followed Sripada Srivallabha.

Sripada Srivallabha was born and lived in Pithapuram, formerly known as Pitikapuram, a town in present-day Andhra Pradesh in India. The grandparents of Sripada Srivallabha belonged to the Malayadri village of Guntur District in the Palnadu area of Andhra Pradesh state in India. Malladi Bapanna Avadhanulu of Harithasa gothra is the maternal grandfather of Sripada. His wife Rajamamba also belonged to a scholar's family. Her brother was Malladi Sridhara avadhanlu belonged to the same place. Once the two scholars went to 'Ainavilli' a remote area in Godavari mandal, and there they conducted a yagna where they actually made Lord Ganapati appear during the time of Poornahuti, which was witnessed by all the people who attended the 'yagna'. Lord Ganapati had received the Poornahuti with his trunk and to the astonishment of all the people, disclosed that he will take birth as Sripada Srivallabha on Ganesh Chaturdhi. Later both the scholars went to Pithapuram village and settled there.

Sripada Srivallabha took sanyas at the age of 16 years, and lived in his physical form only until the age of 30. Some of the noted holy places that Sripada Srivallabha visited during his lifetime are -Varanasi (Kashi), Badarikashram, Gokarna, Srisailam and Kuravapura. Shripad Vallabha stayed in Kurupuram much of his life. The religious significance of Kurupuram is duly mentioned in the book Shri Guru Charitra and other holy books associated with Shri Dattatreya. Shripad Vallabha did many leelas here. It is believed that the Avatar Sripada Srivallabha is 'Chiranjeevi' (immortal) and that he took 'Jalsamadhi' in Kuravapura or Kurugaddi, a river island on river Krishna near Raichur, Karnataka. He disappeared since then as a human but still exists in 'Tejorup' (in Pure energy form). On the opposite bank of the River is Vallabhapuram belonging to Telangana state which is also sacred. It is also believed that Sripada Srivallabha use to come from Kuruvapuram to Vallabhapuram by walking on the river to grace the devotees at Vallabhapuram and Panchadevpahad.

Legend of Vallabhesh and Hedgewar family
Sometime after Sripada Srivallabha disappeared, a Brahmin named Vallabhesh vowed to go to Kuravapur and feed 1,000 Brahmins if he earned more than his usual profit. Near Kuravapur, Vallabhesh encountered bandits in disguise who robbed and beheaded him. Sripada Srivallabha suddenly appeared from nowhere and killed the bandits with his Trishula; one, who appealed to the saint as Shiva, was spared. Being told, the person spared reattached Vallabhesh's severed head to his body to be brought back to life by the grace of Sripada Srivallabha.

Vallabhesh Brahmin is considered the mula-purush (founder) of the Hedgewar family. K. B. Hedgewar, founder of the Rashtriya Swayamsevak Sangh (RSS), was a ninth-generation descendant of Vallabhesh.

References

Sources
 Shri Dattatreya Dnyankosh by P. N. Joshi (Shri Dattateya Dnyankosh Prakashan, Pune, 2000).
 Datta-Sampradyacha Itihas (History of Datta Sampradaya) by R. C. Dhere (Padmagnadha Prakashan, Pune).
 Sri Pada Charitra- Shankar Bhatt (Telugu version by Sri Malladi Diskhitulu)
 Sankshipta Sripada Srivallabha Charitramrutam Parayana grantham (abridged by Smt Prasanna Kumari—Telugu version)
 SriPada Sri Vallabha website - www.sripadavallabha.org
 SriPada Sri Vallabha charitamrutam website Sripada Srivallabha Charitamrutam wtt
 SriPada Vallabha Miracles - www.sripadavallabhamiracles.com
  SriPada Sri Vallabha Sansthan Pithapuram, E.G.District, A.P, India

External links
  Website on SriPada SriVallabha
  SriPada SriVallabha Youtube
 Sripada Sri Vallabha
 Website
 SripadaSrivallabha Mahasamstanam Pithapuram

Medieval Hindu religious leaders
1320 births